is a crossover fighting video game that combines the universes of several Weekly Shōnen Jump manga series, including former series and some that have been transferred to other magazines. It was released in Japan by Bandai Namco Entertainment on March 19, 2014 for the PlayStation 3 and PlayStation Vita in celebration of Weekly Shōnen Jumps 45th anniversary. It was re-released for western territories as J-Stars Victory VS+ for the PlayStation 4, PlayStation 3, and PlayStation Vita, with an additional Arcade Mode for the international release. It was released in Europe on June 26, 2015 and in North America on June 30, 2015. A follow-up game, Jump Force, released on February 15, 2019 to tie in with the 50th anniversary of Weekly Shōnen Jump.

Gameplay
J-Stars Victory VS lets up to four players battle it out against one another using a gameplay and graphical style similar to those of Dragon Ball: Zenkai Battle Royale. Fighters can move and fight in all directions on one of twelve 3D battle fields, each based on a location from a different Jump series. Players should learn the lay of the land and formulate a battle plan with a character suited to it.

A defeated character comes back after a set amount of time passes. To win the battle, all three sections of the WIN gauge at the top of the screen have to be filled; the gauge fills one section each time an opponent is defeated. Fighters can use regular attacks, power attacks, area-based attacks, and finishing moves. Regular attacks are the main part of the battle, and all combos begin with them. Power attacks leave the user open, but they have a big impact if they connect and their power can be increased by charging them up. Area-based attacks allow to hit opponents over a wide area. By using different techniques, the player can lead his team to victory; learning each character's different power, range, and effects is the first step towards being unbeatable.

Playable game modes include "J-Adventure", a multi-player story mode divided between four campaigns in which players explore a world map, battle various opponents, and collect in-game cards to power up their characters; "Victory Road", a multi-player battle mode in which players must complete certain predetermined objectives during battles; and a free-battle mode which supports up to two players in local offline play and up to four players via online multiplayer. An additional single-player Arcade Mode is exclusive to J-Stars Victory VS+.

Plot
The game's story mode, "J-Adventure", takes place in Jump World, an amalgamation of the different characters' universes. As the story begins, each of the characters is preparing for the Jump Battle Tournament, a fighting competition organized by the God of Jump World, who promises to grant the wishes of the team that wins. The narrative is split between four different arcs, each focusing on a different team exploring Jump World, gathering more teammates to compete, and working to achieve their own personal goals. The Dynamic Arc focuses on Monkey D Luffy, Portgas D Ace and Seiya; the Hope Arc on Naruto Uzumaki, Yusuke Urameshi, and Gon Freecss; the Investigation Arc on Toriko, Zebra, and Goku; and the Pursuit Arc on Ichigo Kurosaki, Tatsumi Oga, and Hiei.

To progress, each team defeats tournament examiners to acquire upgrades for their ships so they can reach the arena; they also acquire additional allies in the wake of a mysterious enemy that can possess them. When one of the teams wins the tournament, the God of Jump World reveals the true purpose of the competition: to gather warriors to combat the Dark Phantoms, an evil force capable of impersonating strong fighters. Using the keys of Effort, Bravery and Friendship, the heroes travel to the Dark Phantoms' world and seal them away.

With the Dark Phantoms defeated, all the heroes are offered a wish. They collectively wish to have another tournament so they can fight again and get stronger. Granting it, the God of Jump World rewards the heroes with a feast.

Characters
The game features 52 characters from 32 different Jump series. 39 of these characters are playable, while 13 of them can be summoned by players to provide support.

Playable characters

Assassination Classroom
Koro-sensei
Beelzebub
Tatsumi Oga paired with Baby Beel 
Bleach
Ichigo Kurosaki
Sōsuke Aizen
Bobobo-bo Bo-bobo
Bobobo-bo Bo-bobo paired with Don Patch
Chinyūki: Tarō to Yukai na Nakama-tachi
Taro Yamada
Dr. Slump
Arale Norimaki paired with Gatchan
Dragon Ball
Son Goku
Vegeta
Frieza
Fist of the North Star
Kenshiro
Raoh
Gintama
Gintoki Sakata
Hell Teacher Nūbē
Meisuke Nueno (Nūbē)
Hunter × Hunter
Gon Freecss
Killua Zoldyck
JoJo's Bizarre Adventure
Jonathan Joestar
Joseph Joestar
Kochira Katsushika-ku Kameari Kōen-mae Hashutsujo
Kankichi Ryotsu

Medaka Box
Medaka Kurokami
Naruto
Naruto Uzumaki
Sasuke Uchiha
Madara Uchiha
One Piece
Monkey D. Luffy
Portgas D. Ace
Boa Hancock
Akainu
Reborn!
Tsuna Sawada paired with Reborn
Rurouni Kenshin
Himura Kenshin
Shishio Makoto
Saint Seiya
Pegasus Seiya
Sakigake!! Otokojuku
Momotaro Tsurugi
The Disastrous Life of Saiki K.
Kusuo Saiki
Tottemo! Luckyman
Luckyman
Toriko
Toriko
Zebra
Yu Yu Hakusho
Yusuke Urameshi
Hiei
Younger Toguro

Support characters

Bleach
Rukia Kuchiki
D.Gray-man
Allen Walker
Gintama
Kagura and Sadaharu
Haikyū!!
Shōyō Hinata
Hunter × Hunter
Hisoka
Kuroko's Basketball
Tetsuya Kuroko
Medaka Box
Misogi Kumagawa

Neuro: Supernatural Detective
Neuro Nōgami
Nisekoi
Chitoge Kirisaki
Pyu to Fuku! Jaguar
Jaguar Junichi
Sakigake!! Otokojuku
Heihachi Edajima
Sket Dance
Bossun, Himeko, and Switch
To Love Ru
Lala Satalin Deviluke

In addition to these characters, Gin Tama's Shinpachi Shimura can be heard providing commentary to some of Gintoki's battle actions and pre-fight dialogue. Other characters from each series make non-playable cameo appearances in the game's story mode.

Development
The game was first announced in December 2012 under the title of Project Versus J, in Weekly Shōnen Jumps second issue of 2013. It was made to commemorate the 45th anniversary of Jump, and has been presented as the "ultimate Jump game". J-Stars Victory VS features characters and settings from various Jump manga, both past and present, ranging from older properties such as Dragon Ball, YuYu Hakusho, and Kochira Katsushika-ku Kameari Kōen-mae Hashutsujo, current long-running series such as Naruto, Bleach, One Piece, and JoJo's Bizarre Adventure, to newer series such as Medaka Box, Assassination Classroom, and Beelzebub.

The first three characters that were unveiled and used to promote the game were Son Goku, Monkey D. Luffy, and Toriko. Also in December, it was announced that fans could vote for some of the characters that they want to be included in J-Stars Victory VS. Several other characters were announced over the following months via the "Weekly Shōnen Jump" and "V Jump" magazines, as well as characters' transformations which would be available as special moves. The game's adventure mode also features other non-player characters from the various series.

Producer Koji Nakajima stated that getting the rights to the multiple franchises owned Shueisha was not hard, but rather determining which actions the characters make in the game was the most difficult part. Since some of the characters do not fight in their series, their actions and motions had to be approved by each licensee after many negotiations. He also stated that he originally hoped to include a much larger roster of characters.

A limited edition "Anison" version of the game includes the theme songs from the player characters' television series, such as "Cha-La Head-Cha-La" and "We Are!", as music that can be played in-game during battles. The game's own theme song is "Fighting Stars", performed by Hironobu Kageyama, Hiroshi Kitadani, and Akira Kushida.

J-Stars Victory VS+
In December 2014, Bandai Namco announced that the game would be released in North America and Europe under the name J-Stars Victory VS+. Released in summer 2015, VS+ retains the original Japanese voice-over track and adds an additional single-player Arcade Mode not present in the original release. VS+ also marks the game's first appearance on the PlayStation 4, in addition to the PlayStation 3 and PlayStation Vita as with its predecessor. The new release features an identical character roster to the original, while also incorporating game balance adjustments based on feedback from Japanese players. A J-Stars Victory VS+ Compendium art book and set of PlayStation themes were offered as a pre-order bonus.

Reception

The game was given a review score of 32/40 by Famitsu. Following its first week of release, the PS3 version of the game sold 118,240 units in Japan while the Vita version sold 97,821 units. Japanese sales tracker Media Create reported that the PS3 version of the game sold through 86.55% of its shipment, while the Vita version sold through 89.25% of its shipment. For a multiplatform release, the Vita version did well, Media Create says.

Richard Eisenbeis of Kotaku praised the game's roster for taking from many different series and how each character has a unique fighting style. However, he said that despite this each character plays the same, with strong, weak and knockdown attacks, and titled his review "J-Stars Victory VS Gets Real Old Real Fast". He also noted the lack of a meaningful plot in the story mode.

The western PlayStation 4 release has a score of 61 on Metacritic while the PlayStation Vita version has a 74; both indicating mixed or average reviews. IGN awarded it a score of 5.0 out of 10, saying "Despite a great cast of characters, J-Stars Victory Vs.+ fails to leverage their charm on or off the battlefield".

References

External links
Official website
 
Game Manual  (PS3, PS4)

2014 video games
Bandai Namco games
Bleach (manga) video games
Crossover fighting games
Dragon Ball games
Fist of the North Star video games
JoJo's Bizarre Adventure games
Multiplayer and single-player video games
Naruto video games
One Piece games
PlayStation 3 games
PlayStation 4 games
PlayStation Vita games
Saint Seiya video games
Spike Chunsoft video games
Fighting games
Video games based on anime and manga
Video games developed in Japan
Weekly Shōnen Jump (video game series)
YuYu Hakusho games
Video games scored by Yasuharu Takanashi